Senegal competed in the Summer Olympic Games for the first time at the 1964 Summer Olympics in Tokyo, Japan.

References
Official Olympic Reports

Nations at the 1964 Summer Olympics
1964 Summer Olympics
Oly